Maplewood Park, also known as Seneca Park West, is a landscaped public park in Rochester, New York, situated between Lake Avenue and the Genesee River.  The  park features many trails along the river gorge and the river bank below, scenic views of two waterfalls and a nationally accredited Rose Garden.

The park was laid out by landscape architect Frederick Law Olmsted, who also designed nearby Highland Park, Genesee Valley Park, and Seneca Park, which is now a zoo.

It was listed on the National Register of Historic Places in 2003.

Frederick Douglass statue
A statue of former slave and renowned Underground Railroad conductor Frederick Douglass which was located in Maplewood Park was vandalized and torn down over the weekend of July 4th 2020. The site of the present-day park was located along the Underground Railroad where Douglas and Harriet Tubman helped shuttle slaves to freedom. The statue is a replica of statue of Frederick Douglass in Rochester, New York. Removal also occurred on the anniversary of Douglas' famous 1852 anti-slavery speech at this location.

References

External links

Parks on the National Register of Historic Places in New York (state)
Geography of Rochester, New York
Parks in Monroe County, New York
Tourist attractions in Rochester, New York
Frederick Law Olmsted works
National Register of Historic Places in Rochester, New York
Underground Railroad in New York (state)